Kristian Gerner (born 25 May 1942) is a Swedish historian, author, expert on Eastern Europe and Professor of History at Lund University (since 2002). From 1994 to 2002, he was Professor of Eastern European History and Culture, also at Uppsala University. Gerner earned his doctorate at Lund in 1984.

He is a board member of the Institute for Information on the Crimes of Communism.

On 4 December 2013, in the Swedish newspaper Aftonbladet, he commented on a clip sent on Russian state television where a Swedish children's programme was used as an example, saying that he recognized the arguments from Russian propaganda, calling them sexuality hostile and homophobic, and also saying that they represented a totally heinous atmosphere pursued by the Putin leadership in tight coalition with the Russian Orthodox church.

Publications
 Framtidsinriktad samhällsforskning i Sovjetunionen, with Ingmar Oldberg, 1972
 Konflikten i Teschen 1918-1920, 1974
 Planhushållning och miljöproblem. Sovjetisk debatt om natur och samhälle 1960-1976, with Lars Lundgren, Stockholm, Liber 1978
 Arvet från det förflutna. Sovjet på tröskeln till 80-talet, Stockholm, Liber 1978
 Ideology and Rationality in the Soviet Model. A Legacy for Gorbachev, with Stefan Hedlund, London, Routledge 1989
 Svårt att vara ryss. På väg mot postsovjetismen, Lund, Signum, 1989
 Centraleuropas återkomst, Stockholm, Norstedts 1991, 1992
 The Baltic States and the End of the Soviet Union, with Stefan Hedlund, London, Routledge, 1993
 Hjärnridån. Det europeiska projektet och det gåtfulla Ryssland, with Stefan Hedlund and Niclas Sundström, Stockholm, Fischer 1995
 Centraleuropas historia, Stockholm, Natur och Kultur, 1997, 2004
 Nordens medelhav. Östersjön som historia, myt och projekt, with Anders Hammarlund and Klas-Göran Karlsson, Stockholm, Natur och Kultur, 2002
 Ryssland: en europeisk civilisationshistoria, Lund, Historiska media, 2011

References

20th-century Swedish historians
Academic staff of Lund University
Academic staff of Uppsala University
1942 births
Living people
21st-century Swedish historians